The 2009 season is the 99th season of competitive football in Paraguay.

Primera División

Apertura champion: Cerro Porteño (28th title).
Top scorer:  Pablo Velázquez (16 goals).
Clausura champion: Nacional (7th title).
Top scorer: Cesar Caceres Cañete (11 goals).
Source: RSSSF

Transfers

 List of transfers during the 2009 season registered under the Asociación Paraguaya de Fútbol.

Paraguay national team 
The following table lists all the games played by the Paraguay national football team in official competitions during 2009.

KEY:  F = Friendly match; WCQ2010 = 2010 FIFA World Cup qualification

References

External links
 Paraguay 2009 by Eli Schmerler and Juan Pablo Andrés at RSSSF
 Diario ABC Color

 
Seasons in Paraguayan football